Abakumovo is a rural locality (a village) in Pavlovskoye of Kargopolsky District, Arkhangelsk Oblast, Russia. The population was 95 as of 2012. There are 9 streets.

Geography 
Abakumovo is located 12 km northeast of Kargopol (the district's administrative centre) by road. Chertovitsy Nizhniye is the nearest rural locality.

References 

Rural localities in Kargopolsky District